Kaipa is the first album by Swedish progressive rock band Kaipa, released in 1975, two years after the band formed.

Track listing
Recorded at "Marcus Music Studios" Stockholm, Sweden, July 1975
"Musiken Är Ljuset (English: The Music Is The Light)" (Hans Lundin, Roine Stolt) – 7:04
"Saker Har Två Sidor (English: Things Have Two Sides)" (Hans Lundin) – 4:34
"Ankaret (English: The Anchor)" (Hans Lundin) – 8:40
"Skogspromenad (English: Forest Walk)" (Hans Lundin) – 3:40
"Allting Har En Början (English: Everything Has A Beginning)" (Hans Lundin) – 3:12
"Se Var Morgon Gry (English: See Every Morning Dawn)" (Hans Lundin) – 8:53
"Förlorad i Istanbul (English: Lost in Istanbul) " (Roine Stolt) – 2:24
"Oceaner Föder Liv (English: Oceans Give Birth To Life) " (Roine Stolt) – 9:28

Bonus Tracks Included On "The Decca Years"

Recorded at "Marcus Music Studios" Stockholm, Sweden, February 1975
9. "Från Det Ena Till Det Andra (English: From One To Another)" (Roine Stolt) - 2:49
10. "Karavan (English: Caravan)" (Roine Stolt) - 2:54

Personnel
Roine Stolt - electric and acoustic guitars, backing vocals
Hans Lundin - Hammond organ, lead vocals, Fender Rhodes and grand pianos, Yamaha SY1 synthesizer, harpsichord, Logan string-machine, glockenspiel
Tomas Eriksson - bass, backing vocals
Ingemar Bergman - drums, backing vocals, percussion

Recording Personnel
Marcus Österdahl: Engineer

References

Kaipa albums
1975 debut albums